Bondia is a newspaper published in Catalan. It is published in two editions:

Principality of Andorra
Lleida, Catalonia, Spain

The publisher is Group Bondia. It launched the newspaper in a free Andorran edition in Catalan. In 2006 it started publishing another edition in Lleida, Catalonia with a run of 15,000.

External links
Bondia Andorra edition website
Bondia Lleida edition website
Anuncis Andorra

Mass media in Lleida
Newspapers published in Andorra
Newspapers published in Spain
Publications with year of establishment missing
Spanish-language newspapers